"Schooled" is the second episode of the fourth season of the American sitcom Modern Family, and the series' 74th episode overall. It aired October 10, 2012. The episode was written by Steven Levitan & Dan O'Shannon and directed by Jeff Melman.

Plot
The entire family is gathered at the Dunphy's house for dinner to celebrate Haley's (Sarah Hyland) upcoming first day of college. Right after Phil's (Ty Burrell) toast, Mitch (Jesse Tyler Ferguson) takes the opportunity to say that it is also Lily's (Aubrey Anderson-Emmons) first day at kindergarten, while Manny (Rico Rodriguez) informs everyone that Jay (Ed O'Neill) and Gloria (Sofía Vergara) are also starting classes on how to take care of a new baby.

After an emotional morning where Alex (Ariel Winter) and Luke (Nolan Gould) say goodbye to their sister, Claire (Julie Bowen), Phil and Haley leave for the college. At the college, the only thing that Claire and Phil do is to embarrass Haley and she asks them to leave. Before they go, Phil is giving her a book he made with everything he has learned from life. He calls it "Phil's-osophy". On their way back home, they are both emotional, and a call from Haley to tell them thank you and that she loves them makes them tear up.

Gloria and Jay do not take the class very seriously, and after they share their experience with the rest of the parents-to-be of how to raise a baby, they leave the class early. Manny is disappointed on them for that and he cannot understand why they are not so worried for the baby's arrival when he is terrified. Jay reassures him that everything is going to be alright and he will not let anything happen to the baby or him.

Meanwhile, Lily (Aubrey Anderson-Emmons) gets into a tussle on her first day at kindergarten. Mitch and Cam (Eric Stonestreet) run to her rescue and end up in the principal's (Tom McGowan) office. The principal has also informed Lily's assailant's, Conor, (Mason McNulty) parents about the incident, who are a lesbian couple named Pam (Wendi McLendon-Covey) and Susan (Michaela Watkins). The two couples get into an argument and the principal orders them to have a play-date all together along with their kids so that they can give their kids the right example of how people solve their differences. At Mitch and Cam's house, the playdate does not go well. Pam and Susan decide to leave, but cannot do so as Lily and Conor have locked themselves in Lily's room. Lily does not want Conor to leave because she likes him. When everything settles down, the two couples, despite all their differences, admit that when it comes to their kids they are very much alike.

Reception

Ratings
In its original American broadcast, "Schooled" was watched by 12.08 million; down 2.36  from the previous episode. The next episode of the show, Snip was aired the same day and it was watched by 12.31 million; up 0.23 from "Schooled".

Reviews
"Schooled" received mostly positive reviews along with "Snip", the third episode of the season that was aired at the same night.

Michael Adams of 411mania gave the episode 10/10 saying that he loved the episode and praising Phil's story. "I have said in the past that the show is at its best when the entire family is together, which we briefly had in the beginning, but when they are separate and each dealing with their own troubles and issues they can really shine."

Leigh Raines of TV Fanatic rated "Schooled" with a 4.5/5 stating that this was "one of the funnier episodes ."

Donna Bowman of The A.V. Club gave an A− grade to both episodes saying that she can't wait for more. "Two episodes showcasing solid construction, excellent timing, and graceful fillips of feeling. Suddenly, Modern Family seems to be brimming with confidence, looking forward to the possibilities of a rearranged cast of characters. I can’t wait to see more."

Dalene Rovenstine of Paste Magazine rated both episodes with 8.2/10. "It’s too early to say, but this duo of episodes seem to be paving the way for a better season. Although the premiere was lackluster, these episodes provided laughs reminiscent of the first two seasons."

Wyner C of Two Cents TV gave a good review to the episode saying that it was a "hoot". " I truly loved the touching moments with laughs along the way. My farewell sendoff to college did not contain any tears – did yours?"

Pollysgotyournumbers of Bitch Stole My Remote also gave a good review to the episode stating: "Despite some of the crash-and-burns, this episode is still packed with charm and the show’s trademark attention to the emotions behind the jokes. I am looking forward to how they deal with Haley’s absence and what kind of effect it will have on the story arc this season."

References

External links 
 
 "Schooled" at ABC.com

Modern Family (season 4) episodes
2012 American television episodes
Television episodes directed by Jeff Melman